The Czech-Polish border is the inter-state border between the Czech Republic and the Republic of Poland. The Czech Republic is one of the seven countries currently bordering Poland. This condition persists since January 1, 1993, when Czechoslovakia collapsed. The current border with the Czech Republic was part of the border with Czechoslovakia and had the same route.

History
Polish border with the Protectorate of Bohemia and Moravia
The Polish-Czech border can also be called the border existing for several months in 1939.

On March 16, 1939, the German Reich, after Slovakia declared independence (in fact it client state of Nazi Germany), created from the occupied territories of Bohemia, Moravia and Czech Silesia, which were not directly attached to Germany as the Sudetenland or to Poland as Zaolzie, Protectorate of Bohemia and Moravia. It constituted an autonomous German administrative unit that bordered Poland over a distance of 66 kilometers, and the border coincided with a fragment of the former Polish-Czechoslovak border.

This border ceased to exist on September 28, 1939, when, after the aggression of Germany and the USSR against Poland, the armies of both countries fully occupied the territory of the Second Polish Republic, as a result of which the German and Soviet authorities signed a pact on borders and friendship, which marked the German-Soviet border in the occupied territory of Poland.

During the demarcation of the border in 1958, Poland transferred 1205.9 ha to Czechoslovakia, while Czechoslovakia to Poland 837.46 ha. The so-called border debt, the title of which should be transferred to Poland 368.44 ha. Regulation of the so-called debt has been dealt with since 1992 by the Permanent Polish-Czech Border Commission at the Ministry of the Interior in Warsaw, currently ministries at the Ministry of Foreign Affairs.

On April 7, 2011, the Czech radio announced that the Ministry of the Interior of the Czech Republic plans to give Poland 365 ha of land, i.e. a part of the Liberec Region, located on the so-called Frydlant promontory, between Świeradów-Zdrój and Bogatynia. On April 8 Polish minister Jerzy Miller corrected that the planned regulation of the border line is not related to the so-called border debt, and with administrative procedures resulting from changes in riverbeds. Currently, the areas in the vicinity of Vidnava, Jesionik region and the so-called Frýdlant bag.

Overview
The Polish-Czech ranch runs from the Zittau Valley, south from Bogatynia to Zawidów, through the Jizera Mountains, the Jizera Foothills, the Szklarska Pass, the Krkonoše Ridge, the Lubawska Pass, the Stołowe Mountains, crosses Kudowa-Zdrój, passes between the Bystrzyckie Mountains and the Orlické Mountains, along the Orlice valley, the Międzyleska Pass, the Śnieżnik Mountains, the Golden Mountains, near Złoty Stok, through Głuchołazy south to Prudnik, the Opawica and Opawa valleys, crosses the Odra valley, runs along the Olza valley, through Cieszyn, along the ridge of the Czantoria and Stożek massif in the Silesian Beskids the Olza valley and further to the meeting point of the borders of Poland, the Czech Republic and Slovakia in Jaworzynka.

See also
 Territorial changes of Poland 
 Border Guard (Poland)
 Extreme points of Poland
 Geography of Poland
 Polish border crossings
 Polish rail border crossings

References

External links

 
European Union internal borders
Borders of Poland
Borders of the Czech Republic
International borders